The Ecuadorian mantled howler (Alouatta palliata aequatorialis) is a subspecies of the mantled howler, A. palliata.  It ranges from Panama (or possibly the eastern tip of Costa Rica) through Colombia and Ecuador into northern Peru.  The range limits between the Ecuadorian mantled howler and the golden-mantled howler are not entirely clear.  The Ecuadorian mantled howler replaces the Golden-mantled howler in either extreme eastern Costa Rica or western Panama. The Ecuadorian mantled howler differs from the golden-mantled howler primarily by being paler, with a more yellowish mantle.

References

Mammals of Colombia
Mammals of Ecuador
Primates of Central America
Howler monkeys
Primates of South America
Mammals described in 1903